Carmen Hillinger is a German wheelchair fencer.

Hillinger competed at the 2000 Paralympic Games where she won a silver medal in the épée team event and a bronze medal in the foil team event.

References

Year of birth missing (living people)
Living people
German female fencers
Paralympic wheelchair fencers of Germany
Paralympic silver medalists for Germany
Paralympic bronze medalists for Germany
 Wheelchair fencers at the 2000 Summer Paralympics
Medalists at the 2000 Summer Paralympics
Paralympic medalists in wheelchair fencing
German disabled sportspeople